The 2011 National Games of India, also known as the 34th National Games of India and informally as Jharkhand 2011 was the 34th edition of National Games of India, held from 12 February 2011 to 26 February 2011 in Ranchi, Jharkhand, India.
Services (Services Sports Control Board – SSCB), which was a combined team of the Indian Armed Forces, retained the overall title with 70 gold medals. Services were presented with the Raja Bhalendra Trophy for the champions team. The Maharashtra swimmer  Virdhawal Khade who won 12 medals including 8 golds was adjudged the best male athlete while the Delhi swimmer Richa Mishra who won 16 medals including 11 golds was adjudged the best female athlete. The best state award was won by Manipur which won 48 gold medals to finish in second place overall.

Opening ceremony
The opening ceremony was held at the Birsa Munda Athletics Stadium in Ranchi.
The governor of Jharkhand, M. O. H. Farook had declared the Games open.
Jharkhand chief minister Arjun Munda presided over the function.
The games torch was lit by Indian men's hockey player Sylvanus Dung Dung.
Deepika Kumari, double gold-winner at the  Commonwealth Games took the oath on behalf of the athletes.
A short film on folk hero Birsa Munda, arrival of mascot – the smiling deer 'Chhaua', fire dancers, a laser show highlighting five sporting icons of the state (hockey stars Jaipal Singh Munda, Samurai Tete, Sylvanus Dung Dung, archer Sanjeeva Singh and India cricket skipper MS Dhoni) were the main attractions of the opening ceremony. Popular fusion rock band- "Manthan", composed of students of IIT (ISM) Dhanbad opened the event and entertained the esteemed dignitaries.
Bollywood stars Sameera Reddy,  Vivek Oberoi and Amisha Patel performed in the ceremony along with singer Sukhwinder Singh.

Mascot

The mascot of the games is Chhaua, a deer in running motion holding the torch.
Chhaua depicts the body of a human and head of a stag, symbolising both stillness and energy that characterise Jharkhand's tribal communities. Chhaua means "little boy" in the local language.
The mascot of the games, Chhaua in famous dokra-art will be presented to all the players and officials by the games committee.
The National Games Organising Committee (NGOC) had issued orders for the same to Jharcraft for manufacturing 14,000 mementoes that will be given to players and guests as a remembrance of their arrival in the State. During the opening ceremony of the games, the Games mascot 'Chhaua' – baby deer—made an aerial  entry into the athletics complex and ran around the stadium with the  torch with echoes of Vande Mataram.

Participating teams

 Andhra Pradesh
 Arunachal Pradesh
 Assam
 Bihar
 Chhattisgarh
 Goa
 Gujarat
 Haryana
 Himachal Pradesh
 Jammu and Kashmir
 Jharkhand
 Karnataka
 Kerala
 Madhya Pradesh
 Maharashtra
 Manipur
 Meghalaya
 Mizoram
 Nagaland
 Odisha
 Punjab
 Rajasthan
 Sikkim
 Tamil Nadu
 Tripura
 Uttar Pradesh
 Uttarakhand
 West Bengal
 Andaman and Nicobar Islands
 Chandigarh
 Delhi
 Dadra and Nagar Haveli
 Daman and Diu
 Lakshadweep
 Puducherry
 Services

Sports
There are a total of 444 gold medals in 35 events in the games.
The events are:-

Venues
The 35 events in the games are held in 3 cities – Ranchi, Jamshedpur and Dhanbad, in a total of 21 venues.

Medals tally

Closing ceremony
The closing ceremony of the 34th National Games was held on 26 February 2011 at the Birsa Munda Athletic stadium in Ranchi, Jharkhand. The ceremony began with a monoplane performing aerobatics and showering coloured powder on the stadium. It was followed by an Indian Air Force helicopter showering flowers on the stadium, followed by the para-jump by 12 dare devils of the IAF, who jumped from a height of 4300 feet and anded in the middle of the stadium. The games was officially closed by Suresh Kalmadi, the chairman of the Indian Olympic Association (IOA). He ceremoniously handed over the Games flag to the Kerala officials.  Kerala will host the 35th National Games in December 2012. The Jharkhand chief minister Arjun Munda was the chief guest of the event. The Union sports minister Ajay Maken was supposed to be the chief guest, withdrew from the function due to differences with Suresh Kalmadi. The cultural evening showcased the cultural heritage and folk dances from the participating states, especially Jharkhand, Punjab and Manipur and a team from Kerala displayed their local martial arts and art forms as a prelude of the next games. Bollywood actress Katrina Kaif and singer Shaan performed at the closing ceremony. A special song Vidai has been performed by the "folk artists and percussionists" which formed the "theme of the state's cultural show". There was also a paika dance to celebrate the success of the Games.

References

External links
 Official website

National Games of India
2011 in Indian sport
2011 in multi-sport events
February 2011 sports events in India